Cristian Altinier (born 15 February 1983) is an Italian football attacker who currently plays for Mantova.

Club career
In January 2013, he was loaned to Portogruaro.

References

External links
 Profile on aic.football.it 

Living people
1983 births
Italian footballers
Association football forwards
A.C. Reggiana 1919 players
Mantova 1911 players
A.S. Cittadella players
Hellas Verona F.C. players
A.C. Sambonifacese players
A.S.D. Portogruaro players
Benevento Calcio players
Como 1907 players
Ascoli Calcio 1898 F.C. players
Calcio Padova players
A.S.D. La Biellese players